Call My Bluff is a British panel game show based on the short-lived US version of the same name. It was originally hosted by Robin Ray and later, most notably, by Robert Robinson. Its most prominent panellist was Frank Muir.

Format
The game comprised two teams of three (a captain and two guests) who would compete to earn points by identifying the correct definitions of obscure words. The teams took turns to give three definitions, one true and two bluffs, while the other team attempted to determine which was correct. If the correct choice was made the team earned one point, if not, the bluffing team earned one point. Both teams took turns bluffing and determining definitions.

Examples of words used in the show, taken from a 1972 book published in connection with the it, include "queach", "strongle", "ablewhacket", "hickboo", "jargoon", "zurf", "morepork", and "jirble". "Queach", for instance, was defined as "a malicious caricature", "a cross between a quince and a peach" and "a mini-jungle of mixed vegetation". The first and second of those were bluffs.

The theme music for the show was Ciccolino by Norrie Paramor.

Broadcast history
Call My Bluff originally aired on BBC2 from 17 October 1965 to 22 December 1988. The original host was Robin Ray.

Robert Morley and Frank Muir captained the teams. Morley was later succeeded by Patrick Campbell, and Arthur Marshall took over upon Campbell's death. Various celebrities also stood in as team captains, including Kenneth Horne, Kenneth Williams and Alan Melville. The original series finished after Marshall's death, although a general change in the tone and atmosphere of broadcasting at the time may also have affected its temporary demise. The final host for this run was Robert Robinson.

The show was resurrected in 1996 after an eight-year rest (apart from one special edition on 16 April 1994 for BBC Two's thirtieth birthday, which still featured Robert Robinson, but this time with Joanna Lumley as a team captain opposite Frank Muir), now as a daytime series on BBC1. It began airing on 13 May 1996 with Alan Coren and Sandi Toksvig as the team captains and Bob Holness replacing Robinson as chairman.

In 2003, Toksvig was replaced by the journalist Rod Liddle, and newsreader Fiona Bruce took the chair. The series finished again on 18 June 2004.

Call My Bluff returned for a special during the BBC's 24 Hour Panel People in aid for Comic Relief 2011, with Alex Horne, Roisin Conaty, Russell Tovey, Tim Key, Sarah Cawood and David Walliams participating. The host was Angus Deayton.

Transmissions

BBC2

BBC1

Book
Call my Bluff by Frank Muir and Patrick Campbell, published by Eyre Methuen, London, 1972.

References in other works 
 On the musical episode of Two Pints of Lager and a Packet of Crisps Donna Henshaw and Janet Keogh (played by Natalie Casey and Sheridan Smith) sang:
Smith: "Skankarific's not a word!"
Casey: "It means terrifically skankified, it was on Call My Bluff"
 An episode of the early-'80s LWT sketch-comedy series End of Part One parodied the show as Scrape My Barrel, where panelists had to figure out the meaning of the word working class.
 The show (and in particular its host, Robert Robinson) was the subject of a sketch by Stephen Fry and Hugh Laurie in the second series of A Bit of Fry and Laurie.
 In the "Europe" episode of QI (series E), a segment was featured entitled "Call My Euro Bluff", featuring stories about laws in the EU. The panel then had to decide whether each story was true or a "bløff" (Stephen Fry pronounced it "blerff"). Fry frequently drops into the impersonation of Robinson that he used in the sketch from A Bit of Fry and Laurie.
 In the Doctor Who episode "Bad Wolf" Call My Bluff is mentioned as one of the games hosted in the game station.
 In May 2014 the quirks of the show were lampooned by Harry Enfield and Paul Whitehouse in BBC Two's satirical Harry and Paul's Story of the Twos, where the show was given the name "Speech Impediment" and the word chosen for the panel was paedophile.

References

External links

Call My Bluff at BFI

1965 British television series debuts
2004 British television series endings
1960s British game shows
1970s British game shows
1980s British game shows
1990s British game shows
2000s British game shows
BBC television game shows
British panel games
Lost BBC episodes

ru:Гамруль